Philipp von Bismarck (August 19, 1913 – July 20, 2006) was a German farmer and politician of the Christian Democratic Union (CDU) and former member of the German Bundestag.

Life 
He was elected to the German Bundestag in 1969 for the CDU via a direct mandate in the Gifhorn constituency of Lower Saxony and was a member of the German Bundestag from 20 October 1969 until his resignation on 6 September 1979 (three terms). On 10 June 1979, Bismarck was for the first time elected directly by the citizens to the European Parliament, of which he had been a member since 1978 (elected by the Bundestag).

From 1970 to 1983 he was Chairman of the CDU Economic Council, whose Honorary Chairman he subsequently became.

Literature

References

1913 births
2006 deaths
Members of the Bundestag for Lower Saxony
Members of the Bundestag 1976–1980
Members of the Bundestag 1972–1976
Members of the Bundestag 1969–1972
Members of the Bundestag for the Christian Democratic Union of Germany
MEPs for Germany 1979–1984
MEPs for Germany 1984–1989
German farmers
German landowners